Boutros  Raï, BA, or Boutros (Pierre) Raï (born November 8, 1922 in Aleppo, Syria - died on 7 June 1994), was bishop of the Melkite Greek Catholic Eparchy of Nuestra Señora del Paraíso in Mexico City.

Auxiliary Bishop of Antioch

Boutros Raï was ordained on June 26, 1948 as Chaplain of the Basilian monks. His appointment as Auxiliary Bishop of Antioch and simultaneously titular bishop of Edessa in Osrhoëne of Greek Melkites took place on September 9, 1968. Raï was ordained eparch on November 10, 1968 by  Maximos V Hakim, Patriarch of Antioch, and his co-consecrators were Archbishop Neophytos Edelby, BA and Archbishop Georges Haddad. In 1983 he was appointed by Pope John Paul II Apostolic Visitor of the Melkite Church in Mexico and Venezuela.

Melkite bishop of Mexico

His appointment as bishop for all Melkite Greek Catholic Christians living in Mexico was made on 27 February 1988. On 19 February 1990 Raï was appointed Archbishop "pro hac vice" and assumed duties as the tasks of the Apostolic Exarchs of Venezuela and the Apostolic Visitator in Argentina.

As Melkite archbishop Raï was co-consecrator of Bishop Nicholas Samra, titular bishop of Gerasa, who resided as auxiliary bishop in Newton, United States. As Bishop of Nuestra Señora del Paraíso de México, he served until his death on 7 June 1994.

References

External links
https://web.archive.org/web/20140702010212/http://catholic-hierarchy.org/bishop/brai.html
https://web.archive.org/web/20150101214608/http://www.gcatholic.org/hierarchy/data/archbishops-15.htm#4040*

1922 births
1994 deaths
Melkite Greek Catholic bishops
Syrian Melkite Greek Catholics